Mahallat County is in Markazi province, Iran. The capital of the county is the city of Mahallat. At the 2006 census, the county's population was 48,458 in 14,139 households. The following census in 2011 counted 53,381 people in 16,749 households. At the 2016 census, the county's population was 55,342 in 18,436 households.

Administrative divisions

The population history of Mahallat County's administrative divisions over three consecutive censuses is shown in the following table. The latest census shows one district, two rural districts, and two cities.

References

 

Counties of Markazi Province